The Gulf Coast League (GCL) Padres were a minor league baseball team, that played in Bradenton, Florida from 1981-1982. The club played in the rookie-level Gulf Coast League as an affiliate of the San Diego Padres.

Season-by-season

Baseball teams established in 1981
Baseball teams disestablished in 1982
1981 establishments in California
1982 disestablishments in California
Defunct Florida Complex League teams
Padres
San Diego Padres minor league affiliates